Lectionary 124, designated by siglum ℓ 124 (in the Gregory-Aland numbering) is a Greek manuscript of the New Testament, on parchment leaves. Palaeographically it has been assigned to the 12th century.

Description 

The codex contains lessons from the Gospels of John, Matthew, Luke lectionary (Evangelistarium) with lacunae at the beginning and end. The manuscript contains 162 parchment leaves. The text is written in Greek minuscule letters, in two columns per page, 24 lines per page. It contains pictures.

History 

The manuscript was added to the list of New Testament manuscripts by Scholz. 
It was examined by Bianchini. 

The manuscript is not cited in the critical editions of the Greek New Testament (UBS3).

Currently the codex is located in the Vatican Library (Vat. gr. 1988) in Rome.

See also 

 List of New Testament lectionaries
 Biblical manuscript
 Textual criticism

Notes and references

Bibliography 

 Bianchini, Evangeliarium quadruplex latinae versionis antiquae seu veteris italicae (Rome, 1749), part 1, vol. 2, p. 518.

Greek New Testament lectionaries
12th-century biblical manuscripts
Manuscripts of the Vatican Library